Pat Donnelly (born September 28, 1942) is a Canadian former professional ice hockey player.

Early life 
Donnelly was born in Kincaid, Saskatchewan. He played four seasons of junior hockey (1959–1963) in the Saskatchewan Junior Hockey League with the Prince Albert Mintos and the Estevan Bruins.

Career 
Known as an “excellent back-checker and a tough forward”, Donnelly started his professional career in the Eastern Hockey League (EHL), playing the 1963–64 season with the Nashville Dixie Flyers, and continued the next season in the EHL with the Jersey Devils, before moving to join the Dayton Gems of the International Hockey League (IHL) mid-way through the 1964–65 season. He stayed with the Gems for three seasons, before being traded to the Toledo Blades in exchange for Don Westbrooke prior to the 1967–68 season. Donnelly also played three seasons (1967–1970) with the Des Moines Oak Leafs of the IHL.

References

External links

1942 births
Living people
Canadian ice hockey left wingers
Dayton Gems players
Des Moines Oak Leafs players
Estevan Bruins players
Fresno Falcons players
Jersey Devils players
Nashville Dixie Flyers players
Prince Albert Mintos players
Toledo Blades players
Ice hockey people from Saskatchewan